Career is a 1939 American drama film directed by Leigh Jason and starring Anne Shirley, Edward Ellis and Janet Beecher. The screenplay was written by Dalton Trumbo and Bert Granet, with cinematography by Frank Redman. The film was distributed by RKO Radio Pictures and centers on a rivalry between two men who are in love with the same girl.

Cast
 Anne Shirley as Sylvia Bartholomew
 Edward Ellis as Stephen Cruthers
 Samuel S. Hinds as Clem Bartholomew
 Janet Beecher as Mrs. Amy Cruthers
 Leon Errol as Mudcat
 Rowena Cook as Merta Katz
 John Archer as Ray Cruthers
 Raymond Hatton as Deacon
 Hobart Cavanaugh as Jim Bronson
 Adrian Morris as Irate Bank Customer

References

External links

1939 films
RKO Pictures films
Films scored by Roy Webb
Films directed by Leigh Jason
1939 drama films
American drama films
American black-and-white films
1930s American films